Joseph Carew (c. 1820–1870) was a sculptor in Boston, Massachusetts, active between 1840 and 1870, and collaborated with Thomas A. Carew as the firm Carew & Brother. He exhibited his works frequently at the Boston Athenæum, with major exhibitions in 1853, 1859 and 1860. He also carved monuments for Mount Auburn Cemetery.

Selected works 
 Charles Turner Torrey, "Slave Monument" (late 1840s), Mount Auburn Cemetery
 Ralph Waldo Emerson, marble bas-relief, 1857

References 

 Glenn B. Opitz, Dictionary of American Sculptors, Apollo, 1984. .
 George Cuthbert Groce, David H. Wallace, Dictionary of Artists in America, 1564-1860, New York Historical Society, 1957.

19th-century American sculptors
19th-century American male artists
American male sculptors
Artists from Boston
19th-century American people
1870 deaths
1820s births
Sculptors from Massachusetts